Mammillaria luethyi is a species of cactus which is endemic to Coahuila in Mexico. It grows in only two locations in semidesert habitat. It is also commonly cultivated as an ornamental plant.

References

luethyi
Cacti of Mexico
Endemic flora of Mexico
Endangered plants
Taxonomy articles created by Polbot